Quercus saravanensis is an Asian species of tree in the beech family Fagaceae. It has been found in northern Indochina (Laos + Vietnam), and also in the Province of Yunnan in southwestern China. It is placed in subgenus Cerris, section Cyclobalanopsis.

Quercus saravanensis is a large tree up to 50 m tall. Twigs are hairless. Leaves can be as much as 140 mm long, thin and papery.  The acorn is ellipsoid, 15-20 × 15-20 mm, glabrous; the scar is approx. 8 mm in diameter.

References

External links
line drawing, Flora of China Illustrations vol. 4, fig. 378, drawings 1-4 at top

saravanensis
Plants described in 1934
Trees of China
Trees of Vietnam
Trees of Laos
Taxa named by Aimée Antoinette Camus